Juan Lorenzo Ibáñez de Arilla, O.E.S.A. (7 October 1661 – 21 October 1726) was a Roman Catholic prelate who served as Bishop of Tropea (1697–1726).

Biography
Juan Lorenzo Ibáñez de Arilla was born in Zaragoza, Spain on 7 October 1661 and ordained a priest in the Order of Hermits of Saint Augustine on 22 December 1685.
On 14 January 1697, he was appointed during the papacy of Pope Innocent XII as Bishop of Tropea.
On 20 January 1697, he was consecrated bishop by Marcantonio Barbarigo, Bishop of Corneto e Montefiascone, with Carlo Loffredo, Archbishop of Bari-Canosa, and Gennaro Crespino, Bishop of Squillace, serving as co-consecrators. 
He served as Bishop of Tropea until his death on 21 October 1726.

References

External links and additional sources
 (for Chronology of Bishops) 
 (for Chronology of Bishops) 

17th-century Italian Roman Catholic bishops
18th-century Italian Roman Catholic bishops
Bishops appointed by Pope Innocent XII
1661 births
1726 deaths
Augustinian bishops